Abia is both a surname and a given name. Notable people with the name include:

Koutoua Abia (born 1965), Ivorian sprint canoeist
Abia Brown (1743–1785), a Deputy to the Provincial Congress of New Jersey
Abia Nale (born 1986), a South African football midfielder

See also
Alternate spelling of Abijah, a Biblical name